Aleksandar Sofronijević (Serbian Cyrillic: Александар Софронијевић; born 19 November 1983) is a Serbian accordion player, music producer and leader of his own orchestra, known by the name of Orchestra of Aleksandar Sofronijević. He is considered one of the most popular musicians in the country, due to the fact that he is a constant presence in music shows with high TV ratings and the main accompanist for concerts of the greatest artists from the former Yugoslavia.

Life 
Born and grown up in Kraljevo, Serbia, he lived his childhood with his parents (Radovan Sofronijević and Milena) and his sister Aleksandra. No one in his family was professionally engaged in music, but his parent loved watching music shows with traditional Serbian songs.

Sofronijević got his first accordion at the age of 4 and started to attend private music classes, because his parents noticed the passion that he had for music. He continued playing the accordion in elementary and secondary school, and during school breaks he often played with his classmates, whenever he had an accordion handy. After finishing secondary school, he decided to dedicate his life and future entirely to music, and moved to the city of Kragujevac, where he was enrolled in the Academy of Music and became a professional accordionist by finishing his studies.

Sofronijević has a healthy lifestyle and his daily routine includes training and swim sessions and a healthy diet. His main hobby is cycling provided by the fact that during the summer he often participates in local cycling races and marathons, which last for several days.

Career 
At the age of 16, he participated in the youth competition for accordionists in Sokobanja, where he won the contest after a stunning performance. Two years later, at the age of 18 and playing on the same accordion, he won the contest again, but now in the senior competition, being the youngest one who achieved this honor. This great success gave him the idea to form his own orchestra and thus create a true vision of his musical career.

It is worth noting that Saša Popović believed in the success of Sofronijević and gave him and his orchestra the chance to be an integral part of numerous shows at Grand Production. The first TV show at Grand Production, where he showed his musical talent, was Narod Pita – a show where famous singers from Serbia performed live music.

In 2015 Grand Production started a new talent show where Sofronijević together with his orchestra gained prominence. Nikad nije kasno (translation: It's never too late) is a competition of veteran singers (older than 40 years), who perform the greatest pop and folk music hits and thus have the opportunity to show themselves to an audience of millions of people. The candidates and invited famous artists, who are members of the jury, were all accompanied by Sofronijević and his orchestra until 2022, when the contract with the music show expired.

He had his first live performance on a big concert in 2011, with Ana Bekuta in Belgrade. His orchestra did their best to make this concert to look very professional. This was the starting point for all of the big concerts that followed for Sofronijević and his orchestra. Among the stars that he accompanied at their concerts, it is worth to mention Željko Joksimović, Marija Šerifović, Lepa Brena, Šaban Šaulić, Zdravko Čolić and many other artists both in Serbia and in the region, as well as throughout Europe and the world.

Another interesting remark about Sofronijević is that he often produces soundtracks for movies and TV series. In the film Toma, which illustrates the life of the great folk music singer, Toma Zdravković, all soundtracks were live recorded by Sofronijević and his orchestra. Another example is the popular series Ubice moga oca, where he played for Šaban Šaulić the song Nemam više nikoga, composed by Aleksandra Kovač, and for Saša Matić the song Čujem da se ovih dana razvodiš, composed by Saša Milošević.

Music studio 
In 2021 Sofronijević opened his own music studio in Belgrade, called AS Studioton and being one of the best existing on the Balkans. What it makes being so special is the imposing and modern design, and the devices that are from the latest generation. It offers complete music production, including record and sound processing of vocal and instrumental content. This studio is a dream come true for Sofronijević, who said that he invested all his earnings from music at the time in order to complete the building of the studio.

References

External links 
 Official website of Aleksandar Sofronijević
 AS Studioton

1983 births
Serbian accordionists
Musicians from Kraljevo
Living people